This is a list of Northeast Conference men's soccer regular season first-place finishers, including ties.

Winners by school

* – Mount St. Mary's dropped men's soccer after the 2012 season, but reinstated the sport for 2018.

# – Merrimack joined the conference in 2019.

References

Regular Season Champions